Héctor Mendéz is an Argentine former rugby union footballer and coach. He works as a psychiatrist.

He had 2 caps for Argentina, in 1967, scoring 1 try, 4 points in aggregate. He was nominated joint-coach, with New Zealand Alex Wyllie, of the "Pumas", previously of the 1999 Rugby World Cup finals, but he resigned few days later.

External links
Héctor Mendéz International Statistics

Living people
Argentine rugby union players
Argentine rugby union coaches
Argentina international rugby union players
Year of birth missing (living people)